Furtuna Velaj (born 8 March 1990) is a Kosovan-born Albanian footballer who plays as a midfielder for the Albania national team.

Club career 
Velaj played for four years at Quinnipiac University, scoring 39 goals in 63 matches and receiving many conference and regional accolades. After graduation, Velaj joined the Boston Breakers in the WPSL as a forward winger, but missed the season due to an injury. Her team was the 2012 WPSL regular-season champions.

Velaj continued overseas, first joining Afturelding in Iceland for the second half of the Icelandic Urvalsdeild. Velaj tried to return to play in the new NWSL league as a trialist with the Portland Thorns, but did not make the squad and settled for the amateur team, Toronto Lady Lynx in the USL W-League.

After a good season for Lady Lynx she signed a contract from the former Finnish champions and was meant as a reinforce before the UEFA Women's Champions League. She made her debut in the 4–1 loss against Åland United on 27 July 2013, where she came in as a substitute. After finishing the season in Finland at second place and winning the 2013 Finnish Cup with her team, she transferred to Kolbotn IL in the Norwegian Toppserie at the beginning of 2014.

Velaj played for Albania in Sarpsborg, Norway in late 2013, and shortly afterwards she signed a contract with the Norwegian club Kolbotn IL. She received a shoulder injury playing for the club at La Manga.

After a successful season with Kolbotn IL she transferred to German club SC Sand, where she played for the first and second team. Velaj helped SC Sand II win the Sud Regional Championship, helping the team get promoted to 2nd Bundesliga in 2015 and finishing as top goalscorer in the league with 20 goals. Velaj played one season with the 2nd team and two half season with the first team.

International career 
Velaj helped the Albania national team qualify twice in the world cup preliminary qualifiers in Malta and to advance to the UEFA World Cup group stage in 2013 and 2017. She is the top goal scorer for the Albanian Women's National team with 6 goals and 2 assists. She has featured for Albania 21 times. Her first stint as captain came in 2016 in the last match of the UEFA European group stage qualifiers against France.

See also
List of Albania women's international footballers

References

1990 births
Living people
Albanian women's footballers
Women's association football midfielders
Furtuna Velaj
PK-35 Vantaa (women) players
Kolbotn Fotball players
SC Sand players
Toppserien players
Albania women's international footballers
Albanian expatriate footballers
Albanian expatriates in Iceland
Expatriate women's footballers in Iceland
Albanian expatriate sportspeople in Canada
Expatriate women's soccer players in Canada
Albanian expatriate sportspeople in Finland
Expatriate women's footballers in Finland
Albanian expatriate sportspeople in Norway
Expatriate women's footballers in Norway
Albanian expatriate sportspeople in Germany
People from Deçan
Kosovan expatriate footballers
Kosovan expatriates in Iceland
Kosovan expatriates in Canada
Kosovan expatriate sportspeople in Finland
Kosovan expatriate sportspeople in Norway
Kosovan expatriate sportspeople in Germany
Kosovan people of Albanian descent
Sportspeople of Albanian descent
Kosovan emigrants to the United States
Naturalized citizens of the United States
Sportspeople from Stamford, Connecticut
Soccer players from Connecticut
American women's soccer players
Quinnipiac Bobcats women's soccer players
Boston Breakers players
American expatriate women's soccer players
American expatriate sportspeople in Iceland
American expatriate sportspeople in Canada
American expatriate sportspeople in Finland
American expatriate sportspeople in Norway
American expatriate soccer players in Germany
American people of Albanian descent
Toronto Lady Lynx players